Slavjanka Petrovska (born January 11, 1982) is a Мacedonian politician who has been the Minister of Defense of North Macedonia since January 2022.

Early life and education
Slavjanka Petrovska was born on January 11, 1982, in Skopje. She completed her schooling there before graduating in law from the Ss. Cyril and Methodius University of Skopje in Skopje. She is a candidate for a master's in administrative law at the same institution.

Career
Petrovska worked in the Secretariat on European Affairs from 2003 until 2006, then spent two years working at the Assembly on International Cooperation. From 2008 until 2015, she worked for the National Council on Euro-Integration.

Petrovska was in the Cabinet of the Minister of the Interior for two short stints in 2015 and 2016 and then Chief of Staff to the Minister from June 2017. From January 2020 til July 2020 she was a Deputy Minister of Interior for the caretaker government before the July 2020 parliamentary elections. She was then elected as a Member of the Assembly of the Republic of North Macedonia for the ruling SDSM party, serving on the legislative, oversight, and national security committees.

Petrovska was appointed Minister of Defense by Prime Minister Dimitar Kovačevski on 17 January 2022. She said later that month that North Macedonia favoured a diplomatic solution to the Russia-Ukraine dispute, but would possibly get involved in the conflict if NATO asked. On 1 March, she announced that North Macedonia would donate military material and equipment to Ukraine. 

In June 2022, Petrovska attended the inaugural US-North Macedonia Strategic Dialogue in Washington DC and in October 2022 she made a two-day official visit to Slovenia for bilateral talks.

References

Living people
1982 births
Ss. Cyril and Methodius University of Skopje alumni
Politicians from Skopje
Social Democratic Union of Macedonia politicians
Members of the Assembly of North Macedonia
Defence ministers of North Macedonia
Women government ministers of North Macedonia
Female defence ministers